Mr. Magoo is a 1997 American comedy film directed by Hong Kong film veteran Stanley Tong (his sole English language film) and written by Pat Proft and Tom Sherohman. A live-action/animated film adaptation of UPA's cartoon of the same name, it was produced by Walt Disney Pictures, and stars Leslie Nielsen as the title character, alongside Kelly Lynch, Matt Keeslar, Nick Chinlund, Stephen Tobolowsky, Ernie Hudson, Jennifer Garner and Malcolm McDowell.

The film was a critical and commercial failure, grossing $28 million, against its $30 million production budget.

Plot
Mr. Quincy Magoo, a wealthy but extremely near-sighted canned vegetable factory owner, goes to the museum to attend a party. While there, Waldo, Mr. Magoo's nephew, spies a woman named Stacey Sampanahoditra, on whom he develops a crush. Later that night, jewel thieves Luanne LeSeur and Bob Morgan steal the museum's beautiful ruby "The Star of Kuristan" and escape on a boat to Austin Cloquet, Bob's boss.

Meanwhile, Mr. Magoo and his dog Angus go fishing in the same area as the jewel thieves' boat. Luanne picks a fight with Bob and in the scuffle, they lose the ruby which lands in Mr. Magoo's boat unbeknownst to Magoo. Bob goes after the ruby but fails by falling onto the paddle wheel of a paddle boat.

At the museum, the curator and Stacey send two agents: Gustav Anders of the CIA and Chuck Stupak of the FBI to track down the ruby and spy on Mr. Magoo, who they believe stole the ruby. Stacey mentions she was invited to the opera where the Magoos go that night. Anders and Stupak also visit the opera to look for Mr. Magoo who is in the show. At the opera Mr. Magoo meets Luanne who pretends to be a magazine reporter and uncover FBI agent named Prunella Pagliachi. She wishes Mr. Magoo luck at the opera, who immediately takes a liking to her. Stupak sneaks on the stage and fails to find any clue about Mr. Magoo with Mr. Magoo accidentally hitting Stupak with a big tool.

The next morning, Luanne tricks Mr. Magoo into taking her to his house with an injured ankle. Stupak finds a notebook with Luanne's fingerprints on it and realizes who Mr. Magoo is with. He and Anders go to Mr. Magoo's house where Stupak sneaks in looking for the ruby. Mr. Magoo and Luanne arrive at the house and Stupak hides from them. Bob sneaks into Mr. Magoo's house and finds the ruby. Upon being caught in the act, he steals Mr. Magoo's prized Studebaker with the Magoos and Luanne chasing after him in Magoo's Eggplant-mobile. Bob loses them and brings the ruby to Austin.

Austin plans an auction for his criminal friends from around the world and shows them the ruby. Mr. Magoo disguises himself as Ortega Peru, a thief from Brazil who never goes anywhere and joins the auction which is taking place in a communal indoor pool. However, he is discovered when the fake tattoo on his chest is washed away by the water. Luanne breaks up the auction, steals the ruby, and escapes on a snowmobile away from the lair. The government arrests Austin and his friends while Mr. Magoo gives chase on an ironing board and winds up in the middle of a women's skiing competition. Waldo and Angus sneak out of the lair, catch up with Magoo, and track down the ruby.

Angus sees Luanne in disguise as an old woman and spills her purse which gives Mr. Magoo and Waldo a clue about where Luanne is going. The Magoos follow Luanne to Brazil where Waldo spies on the real Ortega and his friends. Mr. Magoo steals a bride dress from Ortega's girlfriend Rosita and is led to the wedding. Mr. Magoo steals the ruby from Ortega and finds himself being chased by Peru's men, the government agents and Luanne. Magoo then is trapped on a raft just before it goes over a waterfall but manages to invert the raft like a parachute so he can gently float to safety. He and Waldo return the ruby to the museum with the government arresting Ortega, Luanne and the people from Brazil.

Mr. Magoo and Angus go home after returning the ruby back to the museum.

Cast
 Leslie Nielsen as Mr. Quincy Magoo
 Greg Burson as Mr. Quincy Magoo (in animated form)
 Kelly Lynch as Luanne "The Black Widow" LeSeur / Prunella Pagliacci
 Matt Keeslar as Waldo Magoo
 Nick Chinlund as Bob Morgan
 Stephen Tobolowsky as FBI Agent Chuck Stupak
 Ernie Hudson as CIA Agent Gustav Anders
 Jennifer Garner as Stacey Sampanahodrita
 Malcolm McDowell as Austin Cloquet
 Miguel Ferrer as Ortega "The Piranha" Peru
 Frank Welker as Angus the Bulldog and the Mandrill

Production
In the late 1980s, Henry G. Saperstein of UPA, the original owners of Mr. Magoo, announced that the film was set for development at Warner Bros. Pictures, with Steve Tisch producing, acquiring from the rights to produce its first feature. In October 1995, it was announced Disney was in talks with Leslie Nielsen to star in a live-action adaptation of Mr. Magoo. However, it was stuck at development limbo once that never came into reality. It would be in development again once he entered negations with Sony Pictures (which its subsidiary Columbia Pictures had originally distribute to theatres during the '40s through '60s) producers Cary Woods and Robert N. Fried. Once Sony backed out in favor of an American Godzilla film remake, Disney purchased the film rights from Sony.

Filming lasted from March through September 1997. The film was shot in Foz do Iguaçu, Brazil, Argentina and Vancouver, British Columbia, Canada, while the scenes in the museum were filmed in the lobby of the Central Branch of the Vancouver Public Library. The animated sequences were produced by Yowza! Animation, a studio based in Toronto, Ontario, Canada.

Release
Mr. Magoo was released to theatres by Walt Disney Pictures on Christmas Day (December 25) 1997. It was then released on VHS and DVD on July 7, 1998.

Reception

Box office performance
Mr. Magoo grossed $28.9 million worldwide against a $30 million budget, making it a box office bomb.

Critical reception
On Rotten Tomatoes the film has an approval rating of 10%, based on reviews from 31 critics, with an average rating of 2.7/10. The site's consensus states: "Leslie Nielsen's affability can't save this dunderheaded update of Mr. Magoo, which delivers a stream of slapstick gags so lame that audiences will feel like they've stepped on a rake."  Audiences polled by CinemaScore gave the film an average grade of "B" on an A+ to F scale.

Criticism for the film singled out the seemingly mocking portrayal of people with disabilities, although Disney placed a disclaimer right before the closing credits. That said, some critics noted that the disclaimer used at the end of the film was not meant to be an accurate portrayal of near-sighted or blind people. On Siskel and Ebert, both critics gave the film a thumbs down. They both claimed that the disclaimer was funnier than anything in the movie, and thought it was unnecessary and that the film was not offensive towards near-sighted people. Roger Ebert, giving it a half-star out of four in his newspaper review, also called the film "transcendently bad. It soars above ordinary badness as the eagle outreaches the fly." Marc Savlov of the Austin Chronicle gave it 0 out of 5 and said "It's a mess best left to the nitrate ashes of forgotten film and television history." Later reviewing Wrongfully Accused, another Leslie Nielsen film, Savlov said "I was wrong: There are worse things than Mr. Magoo."

Accolades

The film received two nominations at the 1997 Stinkers Bad Movie Awards: Worst Resurrection of a TV Show and Most Painfully Unfunny Comedy, losing both to McHale's Navy and 8 Heads in a Duffel Bag, respectively.

Cancelled sequels
Disney wanted Mr. Magoo to become an "international franchise", but following the critical and commercial failure of the film no sequels were ever produced.

References

External links

 
 
 
 Hidden Mickeys in the film 

1997 films
American films with live action and animation
1990s children's comedy films
American children's comedy films
Films directed by Stanley Tong
Films scored by Michael Tavera
Films set in Brazil
Films set in the United States
Films shot in Argentina
Films shot in Foz do Iguaçu
Films shot in Vancouver
Live-action films based on animated series
Mr. Magoo
Films with screenplays by Pat Proft
Walt Disney Pictures films
American slapstick comedy films
1997 comedy films
1990s English-language films
1990s American films
Films about disability